Walter Bendix Schönflies Benjamin (15 July 1892 – 26 September 1940)  was a German Jewish philosopher, cultural critic and essayist. 

An eclectic thinker, combining elements of German idealism, Romanticism, Western Marxism, and Jewish mysticism, Benjamin made enduring and influential contributions to aesthetic theory, literary criticism, and historical materialism. He was associated with the Frankfurt School, and also maintained formative friendships with thinkers such as playwright Bertolt Brecht and Kabbalah scholar Gershom Scholem. He was also related to German political theorist and philosopher Hannah Arendt through her first marriage to Benjamin's cousin Günther Anders.

Among Benjamin's best known works are the essays "The Work of Art in the Age of Mechanical Reproduction" (1935), and "Theses on the Philosophy of History" (1940). His major work as a literary critic included essays on Baudelaire, Goethe, Kafka, Kraus, Leskov, Proust, Walser, and translation theory. He also made major translations into German of the Tableaux Parisiens section of Baudelaire's Les Fleurs du mal and parts of Proust's À la recherche du temps perdu. 

In 1940, at the age of 48, Benjamin committed suicide at Portbou on the French–Spanish border while attempting to escape from the invading Wehrmacht. Though popular acclaim eluded him during his life, the decades following his death won his work posthumous renown.

Life

Early life and education 
Walter Benjamin and his younger siblings, Georg (1895–1942) and Dora (1901–1946), were born to a wealthy business family of assimilated Ashkenazi Jews in the Berlin of the German Empire (1871–1918). Walter's father, Emil Benjamin, was a banker in Paris who had relocated from France to Germany, where he worked as an antiques trader in Berlin; he later married Pauline Schönflies. He owned a number of investments in Berlin, including ice skating rinks. 

Walter's uncle, William Stern (born Wilhelm Louis Stern; 1871–1938), was a prominent German child psychologist who developed the concept of the intelligence quotient (IQ). He also had a cousin, Günther Anders (born Günther Siegmund Stern; 1902–1992), a German philosopher and anti-nuclear activist who studied under Edmund Husserl and Martin Heidegger. Through his mother, Walter's great-uncle was the classical archaeologist Gustav Hirschfeld. 

In 1902, ten-year-old Walter was enrolled to the Kaiser Friedrich School in Charlottenburg; he completed his secondary school studies ten years later. In his youth, Walter was of fragile health and so in 1905 the family sent him to Hermann-Lietz-Schule Haubinda, a boarding school in the Thuringian countryside, for two years; in 1907, having returned to Berlin, he resumed his schooling at the Kaiser Friedrich School.

In 1912, at the age of 20, he enrolled at the University of Freiburg, but at summer semester's end he returned to Berlin and matriculated at the University of Berlin to continue studying philosophy. There, Benjamin had his first exposure to Zionism, which had not been part of his liberal upbringing. This gave him occasion to formulate his own ideas about the meaning of Judaism. Benjamin distanced himself from political and nationalist Zionism, instead developing in his own thinking what he called a kind of "cultural Zionism"an attitude that recognized and promoted Judaism and Jewish values. In Benjamin's formulation, his Jewishness meant a commitment to the furtherance of European culture. He wrote:  "My life experience led me to this insight: the Jews represent an elite in the ranks of the spiritually active ... For Judaism is to me in no sense an end in itself, but the most distinguished bearer and representative of the spiritual." This was a position Benjamin largely held lifelong.

It was as a speaker and debater in the milieu of the Gustav Wyneken's German Youth Movement that Benjamin was first encountered by Gershom Scholem and later Martin Buber although he'd parted ways with the youth group before they'd become properly acquainted. Elected president of the Freie Studentenschaft (Free Students Association), Benjamin wrote essays arguing for educational and general cultural change. When not reelected as student association president, he returned to Freiburg to study, with particular attention to the lectures of Heinrich Rickert; at that time he traveled to France and Italy.

Benjamin's attempt to volunteer for service at the outbreak of World War I in August 1914 was rejected by the army. Benjamin later feigned illnesses to avoid conscription, allowing him to continue his studies and his translations of works by French poet Charles Baudelaire. His conspicuous refuge in Switzerland on dubious medical grounds was a likely factor in his ongoing challenges in obtaining academic employment after the war.

The next year, 1915, Benjamin moved to Munich, and continued his schooling at the University of Munich, where he met Rainer Maria Rilke and Gershom Scholem; the latter became a friend. In that year, Benjamin wrote about the 18th-century Romantic German poet Friedrich Hölderlin.

In 1917 Benjamin transferred to the University of Bern; there he met Ernst Bloch, and Dora Sophie Pollak (née Kellner), whom he married. They had a son, Stefan Rafael, in 1918. In 1919 Benjamin earned his PhD summa cum laude with the dissertation Der Begriff der Kunstkritik in der deutschen Romantik (The Concept of Art Criticism in German Romanticism).

For his post-doctoral thesis in 1920, Benjamin hit upon an idea very similar to the thesis proposed by Heidegger in the latter's own postdoctoral project (Dun Scotus: Theory of Categories and Meaning). Wolfram Eilenberger writes that Benjamin's plan was, "to legitimize [his theory of language] with reference to a largely forgotten tradition [found in the archaic writings of Duns Scotus], and to strike the sparks of systematization from the apparent disjunct among modern, logical, and analytical linguistic philosophy and medieval speculations on language that fell under the heading of theology". After Gershom Scholem sympathetically informed his friend that his interest in the concept had been pre-empted by Heidegger's earlier publication, Benjamin seems to have derived a lifelong antagonism toward the rival philosopher whose major insights, over the course of both of their careers, sometimes overlapped and sometimes conflicted with Benjamin's. Incidentally, at that time Heidegger was soon to embark on a love affair with Hannah Arendt, later related to Benjamin through marriage to his cousin.

Later, unable to support himself and family, Benjamin returned to Berlin and resided with his parents. In 1921 he published the essay "Zur Kritik der Gewalt (Toward the Critique of Violence)". At this time Benjamin first became socially acquainted with Leo Strauss, and he remained an admirer of Strauss and his work throughout his life.

Friendships 
Starting in adolescence, in a trend of episodic behavior that was to remain true throughout his life, Benjamin was a maven within an important community during a critically important historical period: the left-intelligentsia of interwar Berlin and Paris.  Acquaintance with the eccentric critic was a connecting thread for a variety of major figures in metaphysics, philosophy, theology, the visual arts, theater, literature, radio, politics and various other domains. Benjamin was less of an organizer, impresario, or celebrity author and more of an occult, Zelig-like figure who just happened to be present on the outskirts of an improbably numerous inventory of the most important events within the intellectual ferment of the interwar-period in Weimar Germany and to interpret those events in a peculiar and sometimes unsettlingly premonitory style.

He was in the crowd at the conference where Kurt Gödel first described the incompleteness theorem. He once took a class on the Ancient Mayans from Rainier Maria Rilke. He attended the same seminar as Martin Heidegger at Freiburg in the summer of 1913 when both men were still university students: concepts first encountered there influenced their thought for the remainder of their careers. He was an early draft script reader, comrade and frequent house-guest of Bertolt Brecht's (the most innovative writer and director of the Berlin theater scene, memorably mythologized in the musical Cabaret). Martin Buber took an interest in Benjamin, but the younger author declined to contribute to Buber’s journal because it was too exoteric. He hung out with Ernst Bloch  while the older author was writing the Spirit of Utopia. Now a lesser known work, Bloch's Utopia is included as the representative Bolshevik Jewish work in a group of six prophetic, apocalyptic interwar German books that, George Steiner writes, "were more than books in their dimensions and extremity", characterizing the end-times ambience of thought in Germany during the Weimar period and setting the metaphysical tone of the era whose climax came with the Second World War from the perspective of German intelligentsia contemporary to that moment (other entries in this list include Being & Time by Martin Heidegger, The Decline of the West by Oswald Spengler, The Epistle to the Romans by Karl Barth, The Star of Redemption by Franz Rosenzweig and Mein Kampf by Adolf Hitler). It was Bloch's commission that inspired Benjamin's work on the theory of categories, according to Scholem. This was to be a consequential theme throughout his career.

One of Benjamin's high-school best friends (also a German Jew) committed suicide by gas at the outbreak of the first World War, while another was the one of the Jewish liaisons who took Nazi diplomats on a tour of Palestine during a period of Nazi-Zionist relations when the Third Reich was preparing the European Zionists to believe that Europe's Jews would be forcibly emigrated from the Reich, deflecting communal attention from the looming possibility of the strategy that was actually executed: mass extermination in the death camps. His oldest friend, and sole executor of his literary estate, Gershom Scholem would resurrect the canonical books of the Kabballah from private libraries and ancient document dumps called Genizah when they flooded into Israel as darkness fell in the West during the time leading up to, coinciding with, and following after the Holocaust.

Career 
In 1923, when the Institute for Social Research was founded, later to become home to the Frankfurt School, Benjamin published Charles Baudelaire, Tableaux Parisiens. At that time he became acquainted with Theodor Adorno and befriended Georg Lukács, whose The Theory of the Novel (1920) much influenced him. Meanwhile, the inflation in the Weimar Republic after the war made it difficult for Emil Benjamin to continue supporting his son's family. At the end of 1923 Scholem emigrated to Palestine, a country under the British Mandate of Palestine; despite repeated invitations, he failed to persuade Benjamin (and family) to leave the Continent for the Middle East.

In 1924 Hugo von Hofmannsthal, in the Neue Deutsche Beiträge magazine, published Benjamin's "Goethes Wahlverwandtschaften" ("Goethe's Elective Affinities"), about Goethe's third novel, Die Wahlverwandtschaften (1809). Later that year Benjamin and Bloch resided on the Italian island of Capri; Benjamin wrote Ursprung des deutschen Trauerspiels (The Origin of German Tragic Drama) as a habilitation dissertation meant to qualify him as a tenured university professor in Germany. At Bloch's suggestion, he read Lukács's History and Class Consciousness (1923). He also met the Latvian Bolshevik and actress Asja Lācis, then residing in Moscow; he became her lover and was a lasting intellectual influence on him.

A year later, in 1925, Benjamin withdrew The Origin of German Tragic Drama as his possible qualification for the habilitation teaching credential at the University of Frankfurt at Frankfurt am Main, fearing its possible rejection; he was not to be an academic instructor. Working with Franz Hessel he translated the first volumes of Marcel Proust's À la Recherche du Temps Perdu (In Search of Lost Time). The next year, 1926, he began writing for the German newspapers Frankfurter Zeitung (The Frankfurt Times) and Die Literarische Welt (The Literary World); that paid enough for him to reside in Paris for some months. In December 1926, the year his father died, Benjamin went to Moscow to meet Lācis and found her ill in a sanatorium.

During his stay in Moscow, he was asked by the editorial board of the Great Soviet Encyclopedia to write an article on Johann Wolfgang von Goethe for the first edition of the encyclopedia. Benjamin's article was ultimately rejected, with reviewer Anatoly Lunacharsky (then the People's Commissar of Education) characterizing it as "non-encyclopedic", and only a small part of the text prepared by Benjamin was included in the encyclopedia. During Benjamin's lifetime, the article was not published in its entirety. A Russian translation of the article was published in the Russian edition of "The Work of Art in the Age of Mechanical Reproduction" in 1996.

In 1927, he began Das Passagen-Werk (The Arcades Project), his uncompleted magnum opus, a study of 19th-century Parisian life. The same year, he saw Scholem in Berlin, for the last time, and considered emigrating from Germany to Palestine. In 1928, he and Dora separated (they divorced two years later, in 1930); in the same year he published Einbahnstraße (One-Way Street), and a revision of his habilitation dissertation Ursprung des Deutschen Trauerspiels (The Origin of German Tragic Drama). In 1929 Berlin, Lācis, then an assistant to Bertolt Brecht, socially presented the intellectuals to each other. In that time, Benjamin also briefly embarked upon an academic career, as an instructor at the University of Heidelberg.

Exile and death 

In 1932, during the turmoil preceding Adolf Hitler's assumption of the office of Chancellor of Germany, Benjamin left Germany for the Spanish island of Ibiza for some months; he then moved to Nice, where he considered killing himself. Perceiving the sociopolitical and cultural significance of the Reichstag fire (27 February 1933) as the de facto Nazi assumption of full power in Germany, then manifest with the subsequent persecution of the Jews, he moved to Paris, but before doing so he sought shelter in Svendborg, at Bertolt Brecht's house, and at Sanremo, where his ex-wife Dora lived.

As he ran out of money, Benjamin collaborated with Max Horkheimer, and received funds from the Institute for Social Research, later going permanently into exile. In Paris, he met other refugee German artists and intellectuals; he befriended Hannah Arendt, novelist Hermann Hesse, and composer Kurt Weill. In 1936, a first version of "The Work of Art in the Age of Mechanical Reproduction" (originally written in German in 1935) was published in French ("L'œuvre d'art à l'époque de sa reproduction méchanisée") by Max Horkheimer in the Zeitschrift für Sozialforschung journal of the Institute for Social Research. It was a critique of the authenticity of mass-produced art; he wrote that a mechanically produced copy of an artwork can be taken somewhere the original could never have gone, arguing that the presence of the original is "prerequisite to the concept of authenticity".  In 1937 Benjamin worked on "Das Paris des Second Empire bei Baudelaire" ("The Paris of the Second Empire in Baudelaire"), met Georges Bataille (to whom he later entrusted the Arcades Project manuscript), and joined the College of Sociology. In 1938 he paid a last visit to Brecht, who was exiled to Denmark. Meanwhile, the Nazi régime stripped German Jews of their German citizenship; now a stateless man, Benjamin was arrested by the French government and incarcerated for three months in a prison camp near Nevers, in central Burgundy.

Returning to Paris in January 1940, he wrote "Über den Begriff der Geschichte" ("On the Concept of History", later published as "Theses on the Philosophy of History"). While the Wehrmacht was pushing back the French Army, on 13 June Benjamin and his sister fled Paris to the town of Lourdes, just a day before the Germans entered the capital with orders to arrest him at his flat. In August, he obtained a travel visa to the US that Horkheimer had negotiated for him. In eluding the Gestapo, Benjamin planned to travel to the US from neutral Portugal, which he expected to reach via Francoist Spain, then ostensibly a neutral country.

The historical record indicates that he safely crossed the French–Spanish border and arrived at the coastal town of Portbou, in Catalonia on 25 September 1940. The Franco government had cancelled all transit visas and ordered the Spanish police to return such persons to France, including the Jewish refugee group Benjamin had joined. They were told by the Spanish police that they would be deported back to France the next day, which would have thwarted Benjamin's plans to travel to the United States. Expecting repatriation to Nazi hands, Benjamin killed himself with an overdose of morphine tablets that night, while staying at the Hotel de Francia; the official Portbou register records 26 September 1940 as the date of death. Benjamin's colleague Arthur Koestler, also fleeing Europe, attempted suicide by taking some of the morphine tablets, but survived. Benjamin's brother Georg was murdered at the Mauthausen-Gusen concentration camp in 1942. Despite his suicide, Benjamin was buried in the consecrated section of a Roman Catholic cemetery.

The others in his party were allowed passage the next day (maybe because Benjamin's suicide shocked Spanish officials), and safely reached Lisbon on 30 September. Arendt, who crossed the French-Spanish border at Portbou a few months later, passed the manuscript of Theses to Adorno. Another completed manuscript, which Benjamin had carried in his suitcase, disappeared after his death and has not been recovered. Some critics speculate that it was his Arcades Project in a final form; this is very unlikely as the author's plans for the work had changed in the wake of Adorno's criticisms in 1938, and it seems clear that the work was flowing over its containing limits in his last years.

Thought 

In addition to his lifelong dialogue in letters with Gershom Scholem, Walter Benjamin maintained an intense correspondence with Theodor Adorno and Bertolt Brecht, and was occasionally funded by the Frankfurt School under the direction of Adorno and Horkheimer, even from their New York City residence. At other times he received funding from Hebrew University or from funds made available by Martin Buber and his publishing associates including Salman Schocken. 

The dynamism or conflict between these competing influences—Brecht's Marxism, Adorno's critical theory, Scholem's Jewish mysticism—were central to his work, although their philosophic differences remained unresolved. Moreover, the critic Paul de Man argued that the intellectual range of Benjamin's writings flows dynamically among those three intellectual traditions, deriving a critique via juxtaposition; the exemplary synthesis is "Theses on the Philosophy of History". At least one scholar, historian of religion Jason Josephson-Storm, has argued that Benjamin's diverse interests may be understood in part by understanding the influence of Western Esotericism on Benjamin. Some of Benjamin's key ideas were adapted from occultists and New Age figures including Eric Gutkind and Ludwig Klages, and his interest in esotericism is known to have extended far beyond the Jewish Kabbalah.

"Theses on the Philosophy of History" 

"Theses on the Philosophy of History" is often cited as Benjamin's last complete work, having been completed, according to Adorno, in the spring of 1940. The Institute for Social Research, which had relocated to New York, published Theses in Benjamin's memory in 1942. Margaret Cohen writes in the Cambridge Companion to Walter Benjamin:

In the essay, Benjamin's famed ninth thesis struggles to reconcile the Idea of Progress in the present with the apparent chaos of the past:

The final paragraph about the Jewish quest for the Messiah provides a harrowing final point to Benjamin's work, with its themes of culture, destruction, Jewish heritage and the fight between humanity and nihilism. He brings up the interdiction, in some varieties of Judaism, of attempts to determine the year when the Messiah would come into the world, and points out that this did not make Jews indifferent to the future "for every second of time was the strait gate through which the Messiah might enter".

"The Work of Art in the Age of Mechanical Reproduction" 

Perhaps Walter Benjamin's best known essay, "The Work of Art in the Age of Mechanical Reproduction," identifies the perceptual shift that takes place when technological advancements emphasize speed and reproducibility. The aura is found in a work of art that contains presence. The aura is precisely what cannot be reproduced in a work of art: its original presence in time and space. He suggests a work of art's aura is in a state of decay because it is becoming more and more difficult to apprehend the time and space in which a piece of art is created.

This essay also introduces the concept of the optical unconscious, a concept that identifies the subject's ability to identify desire in visual objects. This also leads to the ability to perceive information by habit instead of rapt attention.

The Origin of German Tragic Drama 

Ursprung des deutschen Trauerspiels (The Origin of German Tragic Drama, 1928), is a critical study of German baroque drama, as well as the political and cultural climate of Germany during the Counter-Reformation (1545–1648). Benjamin presented the work to the University of Frankfurt in 1925 as the (postdoctoral) dissertation meant to earn him the Habilitation (qualification) to become a university instructor in Germany.

Professor Schultz of University of Frankfurt found The Origin of German Tragic Drama inappropriate for his Germanistik department (Department of German Language and Literature), and passed it to the Department of Aesthetics (philosophy of art), the readers of which likewise dismissed Benjamin's work. The university officials recommended that Benjamin withdraw Ursprung des deutschen Trauerspiels as a Habilitation dissertation to avoid formal rejection and public embarrassment. He heeded the advice, and three years later, in 1928, he published The Origin of German Tragic Drama as a book.

One Way Street 

Einbahnstraße (One Way Street, 1928) is a series of meditations written primarily during the same phase as The Origin of German Tragic Drama, after Benjamin had met Asja Lācis on the beach at Capri in 1924. He finished the cycle in 1926, and put it out the same year that his failed thesis was published. 

It is a kind of a collage work. Greil Marcus compares certain formal qualities of the book to the graphic novel Hundred Headless Women by Max Ernst and André Breton, or to Walter Ruttman's The Weekend (an early sound collage film). The book avoids, "all semblance of linear-narrative...[offering] a jumble of sixty apparently autonomous short prose pieces: aphorisms, jokes, dream protocols, cityscapes, landscapes, and mindscapes; portions of writing manuals, trenchant contemporary political analysis; prescient appreciations of the child's psychology, behavior, and moods; decodings of bourgeois fashion, living arrangments and courtship patterns; and time and again, remarkable penetrations into the heart of every day things, what Benjamin would later call a mode of empathy with 'the soul of the commodity'" according to Michael Jennings in his introduction to the work. He continues: "Many of the pieces...first appeared in the feuilleton section," of newspapers and magazines which was "not a separate section but rather an area at the bottom of every page...and the spatial restrictions of the feuilleton played a decisive role in shaping the prose form on which the book is based."

Written contemporaneously with Martin Heidegger's Being & Time, Benjamin's work from this period explores much of the same territory: formally in his "Epistemo-Critical Prologue" to The Origin of German Tragic Drama, and as sketches, allusions and asides in One Way Street.

The Arcades Project 

The Passagenwerk (Arcades Project, 1927–40) was Benjamin's final, incomplete book about Parisian city life in the 19th century, especially about the Passages couverts de Paris—the covered passages that extended the culture of flânerie (idling and people-watching) when inclement weather made flânerie infeasible in the boulevards and streets proper. In this work Benjamin uses his fragmentary style to write about the rise of modern European urban culture. Several of the major published works that appeared in his lifetime—"The Work of Art in the Age of Mechanical Reproduction", "Paris, The Capital of the 19th Century", and his late essays and monograph on Baudelaire—are fragments of the book that he developed as standalone pieces for publication.

The Arcades Project, in its current form, brings together a massive collection of notes Benjamin filed together from 1927 to 1940.

The Arcades Project was published for the first time in 1982, and is over a thousand pages long.

Writing style 
Scholem said of Benjamin's prose: “Among the peculiarities of Benjamin’s philosophical prose—the critical and metaphysical prose, in which the Marxist element constitutes something like an inversion of the metaphysical-theological—is its enormous suitability for canonization; I might almost say for quotation as a kind of Holy Writ." Scholem commentary on this phenomena continue at length. Briefly: Benjamin's texts have an occult quality in the sense that passages appearing quite lucid today may seem impenetrable later, and elements that read as indecipherable or incoherent now may read as transparently obvious upon later revisitation.

Susan Sontag said that in Benjamin's writing, sentences did not originate ordinarily, do not progress into one another, and delineate no obvious line of reasoning, as if each sentence "had to say everything, before the inward gaze of total concentration dissolved the subject before his eyes", a "freeze-frame baroque" style of writing and cogitation. "His major essays seem to end just in time, before they self-destruct". The occasional difficulties of Benjamin's style are essential to his philosophical project. Fascinated by notions of reference and constellation, his goal in later works was to use intertexts to reveal aspects of the past that cannot, and should not, be understood within greater, monolithic constructs of historical understanding.

Benjamin's writings identify him as a modernist for whom the philosophic merges with the literary: logical philosophic reasoning cannot account for all experience, especially not for self-representation via art. He presented his stylistic concerns in "The Task of the Translator", wherein he posits that a literary translation, by definition, produces deformations and misunderstandings of the original text. Moreover, in the deformed text, otherwise hidden aspects of the original, source-language text are elucidated, while previously obvious aspects become unreadable. Such translational modification of the source text is productive; when placed in a specific constellation of works and ideas, newly revealed affinities, between historical objects, appear and are productive of philosophical truth.

His work "The Task of the Translator" was later commented by the French translation scholar Antoine Berman (L'âge de la traduction).

Legacy and reception 
Since the publication of Schriften (Writings, 1955), 15 years after his death, Benjamin's work—especially the essay "The Work of Art in the Age of Mechanical Reproduction" (French edition, 1936)—has become of seminal importance to academics in the humanities disciplines. In 1968, the first Internationale Walter Benjamin Gesellschaft was established by the German thinker, poet and artist Natias Neutert, as a free association of philosophers, writers, artists, media theoreticians and editors. They did not take Benjamin's body of thought as a scholastic "closed architecture [...], but as one in which all doors, windows and roof hatches are widely open", as the founder Neutert put it—more poetically than politically—in his manifesto. The members felt liberated to take Benjamin's ideas as a welcome touchstone for social change.

Like the first Internationale Walter Benjamin Gesellschaft, a new one, established in 2000, researches and discusses the imperative that Benjamin formulated in his "Theses on the Philosophy of History": "In every era the attempt must be made anew to wrest the tradition away from a conformism that is about to overpower it."

The successor society was registered in Karlsruhe (Germany); Chairman of the Board of Directors was Bernd Witte, an internationally recognized Benjamin scholar and Professor of Modern German Literature in Düsseldorf (Germany). Its members come from 19 countries, both within and beyond Europe and it provides an international forum for discourse. The Society supported research endeavors devoted to the creative and visionary potential of Benjamin's works and their view of 20th century modernism. Special emphasis had been placed upon strengthening academic ties to Latin America and Eastern and Central Europe.
The society conducts conferences and exhibitions, as well as interdisciplinary and intermedial events, at regular intervals and different European venues:
 Barcelona Conference – September 2000
 Walter-Benjamin-Evening at Berlin – November 2001
 Walter-Benjamin-Evening at Karlsruhe – January 2003
 Rome Conference – November 2003
 Zurich Conference – October 2004
 Paris Conference – June 2005
 Düsseldorf Conference – June 2005
 Düsseldorf Conference – November 2005
 Antwerpen Conference – May 2006
 Vienna Conference – March 2007

In 2017 Walter Benjamin's Arcades Project was reinterpreted in an exhibition curated by Jens Hoffman, held at the Jewish Museum in New York City. The exhibition, entitled "The Arcades: Contemporary Art and Walter Benjamin", featured 36 contemporary artworks representing the 36 convolutes of Benjamin's Project.

In 2022, a modern Russian philosopher, specialist in media studies and translator of Benjamin's works into Russian, created the Russian-language Telegram channel "Radio Benjamin".

Commemoration 

A commemorative plaque is located by the residence where Benjamin lived in Berlin during the years 1930–1933: (Prinzregentenstraße 66, Berlin-Wilmersdorf). A commemorative plaque is located in Paris (10 rue Dombasle, 15th) where Benjamin lived in 1938–1940.

Close by Kurfürstendamm, in the district of Charlottenburg-Wilmersdorf, a town square created by Hans Kollhoff in 2001 was named "Walter-Benjamin-Platz". There is a memorial sculpture by the artist Dani Karavan at Portbou, where Walter Benjamin ended his life. It was commissioned to mark 50 years since his death.

Works (selection) 
Among Walter Benjamin's works are:

 "Über Sprache überhaupt und über die Sprache des Menschen" ("On Language as Such and on the Language of Man", 1916)
 "Die Aufgabe des Übersetzers" ("The Task of the Translator", 1921) – English translations by Harry Zohn, 1968, and by Stephen Rendell, 1997
 "Zur Kritik der Gewalt" ("Critique of Violence", 1921)
 "Goethes Wahlverwandtschaften" (Goethe's Elective Affinities, 1922)
 Ursprung des deutschen Trauerspiels (The Origin of German Tragic Drama, 1928)
 Einbahnstraße (One Way Street, 1928)
 "Karl Kraus" (1931, in the Frankfurter Zeitung)
 "Kafka" ("Some Remarks on Kafka", excerpted from a 1938 letter to Gershom Scholem)
 "Das Kunstwerk im Zeitalter seiner technischen Reproduzierbarkeit" ("The Work of Art in the Age of Mechanical Reproduction", 1935)
 "Paris, Hauptstadt des 19. Jahrhunderts" ("Paris, Capital of the 19th Century," 1935. This essay is often presented as a diptych with "Paris of the Second Empire in Baudelaire", as both are fragments or preparatory writings for the unfinished Arcades Project.)
 Berliner Kindheit um neunzehnhundert (Berlin Childhood around 1900, 1938)
 "Das Paris des Second Empire bei Baudelaire" ("The Paris of the Second Empire in Baudelaire", 1938)
 "Über den Begriff der Geschichte" ("Theses on the Philosophy of History", 1940)

See also 
 Gertrud Kolmar
 Michael Heller
 List of people from Berlin

References

Further reading

Primary literature 

 The Arcades Project, Harvard University Press, 
 Berlin Childhood Around 1900, Harvard University Press, 
 Charles Baudelaire: A Lyric Poet In The Era Of High Capitalism. 
 The Complete Correspondence, 1928–1940, Harvard University Press, 
 The Correspondence of Walter Benjamin, 1910–1940. 
 The Correspondence of Walter Benjamin and Gershom Scholem. 
 Illuminations. 
 Moscow Diary, Harvard University Press, 
 One Way Street and Other Writings. 
 Reflections. 
 On Hashish, Harvard University Press, 
 The Origin of German Tragic Drama. 
 Understanding Brecht. 
 Selected Writings in four volumes Harvard University Press:
 Volume 1, 1913–1926, 
 Volume 2, 1927–1934, 
 Volume 3, 1935–1938, 
 Volume 4, 1938–1940, 
 The Writer of Modern Life: Essays on Charles Baudelaire, Harvard University Press, 
 The Work of Art in the Age of Its Technological Reproducibility, and Other Writings on Media, Harvard University Press, 
 Walter Benjamin's Archive: Images, Texts, Signs. Ed. Ursula Marx, Gudrun Schwarz, Michael Schwarz, Erdmut Wizisla. 
  The Sonnets of Walter Benjamin. Trans. Andrew Paul Wood, bilingual edition German/English, Kilmog P., Dunedin, 2020.
 Toward the Critique of Violence: a Critical Edition.  Ed. Peter Fenves and Julia Ng. Stanford, Stanford U.P., 2021.

Secondary literature 

 Adorno, Theodor. (1967). Prisms (Studies in Contemporary German Social Thought). London: Neville Spearman Ltd. [reprinted by MIT Press, Cambridge, 1981.  (cloth) –  (paper)]
 Victor Malsey, Uwe Raseh, Peter Rautmann, Nicolas Schalz, Rosi Huhn, Passages. D'après Walter Benjamin / Passagen. Nach Walter Benjamin. Mainz: Herman Schmidt, 1992. 
 Benjamin, Andrew and Peter Osborne, eds. (1993). Walter Benjamin's Philosophy: Destruction and Experience. London: Routledge.  (cloth) –  (paper) [reprinted by Clinamen Press, Manchester, 2000.  (paper)]
 Buck-Morss, Susan. (1991). The Dialectics of Seeing: Walter Benjamin and the Arcades Project. Cambridge: The MIT Press.  (cloth) –  (paper)
 Betancourt, Alex. (2008). Walter Benjamin and Sigmund Freud: Between Theory and Politics. Saarbrücken, Germany: VDM Verlag. 
 Federico Castigliano, Flâneur. The Art of Wandering the Streets of Paris, 2016. .
 Derrida, Jacques. (2001). "Force of Law: The 'Mystical Foundation of Authority, in Acts of Religion, Gil Anidjar, ed. London: Routledge.  (cloth) – 
 Caygill, Howard. (1998) Walter Benjamin: The Colour of Experience. London: Routledge.
 de Man, Paul.  (1986).  Conclusions': Walter Benjamin's 'Task of the Translator, in The Resistance to Theory.  Minneapolis: University of Minnesota Press. pp. 73–105. 
 Eiland, Howard and Michael W. Jennings. (2014). Walter Benjamin: A Critical Life. Cambridge, MA and London: Harvard University Press. 
 __. (2004). The Cambridge Companion to Walter Benjamin. Cambridge: Cambridge University Press.  (cloth)  (paper)
 Eilenberger, Wolfram (2020). Time of the magicians: Wittgenstein, Benjamin, Cassirer, Heidegger, and the decade that reinvented philosophy. New York: Penguin Press.  (cloth)
 Ferris, David S., ed. (1996). Walter Benjamin: Theoretical Questions. Stanford: Stanford University Press.  (cloth) –  (paper)
 Gandler, Stefan (2010). "The Concept of History in Walter Benjamin's Critical Theory", in Radical Philosophy Review, San Francisco, CA, Vol. 13, Nr. 1, pp. 19–42. .
 Jacobs, Carol. (1999). In the Language of Walter Benjamin. Baltimore: Johns Hopkins Press.  (cloth) –  (paper)
 Jennings, Michael. (1987). Dialectical Images: Walter Benjamin's Theory of Literary Criticism. Ithaca: Cornell University Press.  (cloth)
 Jacobson, Eric. (2003).  Metaphysics of the Profane: The Political Theology of Walter Benjamin and Gershom Scholem. New York: Columbia University Press, S. 352ff.
 Kermode, Frank. "Every Kind of Intelligence; Benjamin", New York Times. 30 July 1978.
 Kirst-Gundersen, Karoline. Walter Benjamin's Theory of Narrative. Dissertation, University of Wisconsin-Madison, 1989
 Kishik, David. (2015). "The Manhattan Project: A Theory of a City." Stanford: Stanford University Press.  (cloth) –  (paper)
 Leslie, Esther. (2000). Walter Benjamin, Overpowering Conformism. London: Pluto Press.  (cloth) –  (paper)
 Libero Federici, Il misterioso eliotropismo. Filosofia, politica e diritto in Walter Benjamin, Ombre Corte, Verona 2017
 Lindner, Burkhardt, ed. (2006). Benjamin-Handbuch: Leben – Werk – Wirkung Stuttgart: Metzler.  (paper)
 Löwy, Michael. (2005). Fire Alarm: Reading Walter Benjamin's 'On the Concept of History.''' Trans. Chris Turner. London and New York: Verso.
 Marchesoni, Stefano. (2016). Walter Benjamins Konzept des Eingedenkens. Über Genese und Semantik einer Denkfigur. Berlin: Kadmos Verlag. 
 
 Menke, Bettine. (2010). Das Trauerspiel-Buch. Der Souverän – das Trauerspiel – Konstellationen – Ruinen. Bielefeld: . .
 Missac, Pierre (1996). Walter Benjamin's Passages. Cambridge: MIT Press.  (cloth) – (paper)
 Neutert, Natias : Mit Walter Benjamin! Poeto-philosophisches Manifest zur Gründung der Internationalen Walter Benjamin Gesellschaft. Lüdke Verlag, Hamburg 1968.
 Perret, Catherine "Walter Benjamin sans destin", Ed. La Différence, Paris, 1992, rééd. revue et augmentée d'une préface, Bruxelles, éd. La Lettre volée, 2007.
 Perrier, Florent, ed., Palmier, Jean-Michel (Author), Marc Jimenez (Preface). (2006) Walter Benjamin. Le chiffonnier, l'Ange et le Petit Bossu. Paris: Klincksieck. 
 Pignotti, Sandro (2009): Walter Benjamin – Judentum und Literatur. Tradition, Ursprung, Lehre mit einer kurzen Geschichte des Zionismus. Rombach, Freiburg 
 Plate, S. Brent (2004) Walter Benjamin, Religion and Aesthetics. London: Routledge. 
 Roberts, Julian (1982).  Walter Benjamin.  London: Macmillan.
 Rudel, Tilla (2006) : Walter Benjamin L'Ange assassiné, éd. Menges – Place Des Victoires, 2006 
 Rutigliano, Enzo: Lo sguardo dell'angelo, Bari, Dedalo, 1983
 Scheurmann, Ingrid, ed., Scheurmann, Konrad ed., Unseld, Siegfried (Author), Menninghaus, Winfried (Author), Timothy Nevill (Translator) (1993). For Walter Benjamin – Documentation, Essays and a Sketch including: New Documents on Walter Benjamin's Death. Bonn: AsKI e.V. 
 Scheurmann, Ingrid / Scheurmann, Konrad (1995). Dani Karavan – Hommage an Walter Benjamin. Der Gedenkort 'Passagen' in Portbou. Homage to Walter Benjamin. 'Passages' Place of Remembrance at Portbou. Mainz: Zabern. 
 Scheurmann, Konrad (1994) Passages Dani Karavan: An Environment in Remembrance of Walter Benjamin Stedelijk Museum Amsterdam. Bonn: AsKI e.V. 
 Schiavoni, Giulio. (2001). Walter Benjamin: Il figlio della felicità. Un percorso biografico e concettuale. Turin: Giulio Einaudi Editore. 
 Scholem, Gershom.  (2003). Walter Benjamin: The Story of a Friendship. Trans. Harry Zohn. New York: New York Review Books. 
 Steinberg, Michael P., ed. (1996). Walter Benjamin and the Demands of History. Ithaca: Cornell University Press.  (cloth) –  (paper)
 Steiner, Uwe. (2010).  Walter Benjamin: An Introduction to his Work and Thought. Trans. Michael Winkler. Chicago and London: University of Chicago Press. 
 Singh, Iona (2012) Vermeer, Materialism and the Transcendental in Art, from Color, Facture, Art & Design. Hampshire: Zero Books 
 Taussig, Michael. (2006). Walter Benjamin's Grave. Chicago: University of Chicago Press. .
 Tedman, Gary. (2012). the Art Aesthetic State Apparatuses - from Aesthetics & Alienation. Hampshire : Zero Books. .
 Weber, Samuel. (2008). Benjamin's -abilities.  Cambridge, MA: Harvard University Press.  (cloth) –  (paper)
 Weigel, Sigrid. (2013). Walter Benjamin. Images, the Creaturely, and the Holy. Transl. by Chadwick Truscott Smith. Stanford, CA: Stanford University Press. 
 Witte, Bernd. (1996). Walter Benjamin: An Intellectual Biography. New York: Verso. 
 Wizisla, Erdmut. 2009. Walter Benjamin and Bertolt Brecht — The Story of a Friendship. Translated by Christine Shuttleworth. London / New Haven: Libris / Yale University Press.  [Contains a complete translation of the newly discovered Minutes of the meetings around the putative journal Krise und Kritik (1931)].
 Wolin, Richard, Telos 43, An Aesthetic of Redemption: Benjamin's Path to Trauerspiel. New York: Telos Press Ltd., Spring 1980. (Telos Press).
 Wolin, Richard, Telos 53, The Benjamin-Congress: Frankfurt (July 13, 1982). New York: Telos Press Ltd., Fall 1982. (Telos Press).

 In other media 

 Les Unwanted de Europa (2018 film on Benjamin's last days
 13, a ludodrama about Walter Benjamin, a cinematic essay by Carlos Ferrand and Thomas Sieber Satinsky, 2018, 77 min.
 The Passages of Walter Benjamin (2014 documentary)
 Who Killed Walter Benjamin? (2005 documentary)
 One Way Street: Fragments for Walter Benjamin'' (1992 documentary)

External links 

 
 Walter Benjamin Archive at Marxists Internet Archive
 "Walter Benjamin" at the Stanford Encyclopedia of Philosophy
 The Internationale Walter Benjamin Gesellschaft (in English and German) at Internet Archive
 "Radio Benjamin". Telegram channel of modern Russian philosopher Igor Chubarov (in Russian)

 
1892 births
1940 deaths
1940 suicides
19th-century German Jews
20th-century essayists
20th-century German Jews
20th-century German male writers
20th-century German non-fiction writers
20th-century German philosophers
20th-century translators
Aphorists
Bibliophiles
Book and manuscript collectors
Communication scholars
Continental philosophers
Critical theorists
Drug-related suicides in Spain
Epistemologists
Exilliteratur writers
Frankfurt School
Franz Kafka scholars
German anti-capitalists
German expatriates in Spain
German humanists
German Jews who died in the Holocaust
German literary critics
German literary theorists
German male essayists
German male non-fiction writers
German Marxist writers
German Marxists
German political philosophers
German socialists
German translation scholars
Hermeneutists
Humboldt University of Berlin alumni
Jewish emigrants from Nazi Germany to France
Jewish philosophers
Jewish socialists
Ludwig Maximilian University of Munich alumni
Marxist humanists
Marxist theorists
Metaphysicians
20th-century mystics
Ontologists
People from Charlottenburg-Wilmersdorf
Philosophers of art
Philosophers of culture
Philosophers of history
Philosophers of language
Philosophers of literature
Philosophers of social science
Philosophers of technology
Philosophers of war
Philosophy writers
Social commentators
Social philosophers
Suicides by Jews during the Holocaust
Theorists on Western civilization
Translators of Charles Baudelaire
University of Bern alumni
University of Freiburg alumni
Urban theorists
Writers about activism and social change
Writers from Berlin
Critics of work and the work ethic